David VI Narin (also called the Clever) (1225–1293), from the Bagrationi dynasty, was king of Georgia in 1245–1293. From 1259 to 1293, he ruled the kingdom of Imereti under the name David I as a vassal state of Georgia.

Life
The son of Queen Rusudan by her husband, Ghias ad-din, David was crowned at Kutaisi, as joint sovereign by his mother in 1230. Fearing that her nephew David VII Ulu would claim the throne at her death, Rusudan held the latter prisoner at the court of her son-in-law, the Seljuk sultan Kaykhusraw II, and sent her son David to the Mongol court of Batu Khan in Karakorum to get official recognition as heir apparent. She died in 1245, still waiting for her son to return. 

Since David was believed by the Georgian nobles to have disappeared, two years later, they proclaimed his cousin David VII Ulu, who had been freed on the death of Kaykhusraw, as king of Georgia. In 1248, David, son of Rusudan, was recognized by Güyük Khan as junior co-king to his cousin David. Thereafter known as David VI Narin (i.e. “the junior”) and David VII Ulu (i.e. “the senior”), the cousins ruled jointly until 1259, when the former rose, unsuccessfully, against the Mongol yoke and, then, fled to Kutaisi, from whence he reigned over western Georgia (Imereti) as a separate ruler. In 1261, he gave shelter to David VII Ulu, who in his turn had attempted to end the Mongol dominance. David Ulu made peace with the Mongols and returned to Tbilisi, eastern Georgia in 1262. Thus, Georgia split into two parts and both rulers continued to be titled king of Georgia. However, David Narin surrendered to Hulagu Khan thus becoming a nominal vassal of the Ilkhans in 1262.

He developed friendly relations with the Golden Horde and the Bahri dynasty of Egypt, and repulsed the Ilkhanate attacks. In 1269, David gave shelter to Teguder, relative of the Chagatai Baraq Khan, who had rebelled against the Ilkhan ruler Abaqa Khan. When Teguder’s force began terrorizing the Georgian population, David sided with Abaqa’s general Shiramun Noyan. Despite this, Abaqa attempted to overthrow David with the help of the renegade lord of Racha Kakhaber Kakhaberisdze, and sent two expeditions against Imereti in the 1270s. Nevertheless, David VI Narin succeeded in retaining his independence and attempted to restore Georgian influence in the Empire of Trebizond. For this purpose, he marched to Trebizond during Emperor John II Comnenus’ absence at Constantinople in April 1282; and although he failed to take the city, the Georgians occupied several provinces and helped John’s half-sister Theodora, daughter of Manuel I of Trebizond by his Georgian wife, Rusudan, seize the throne in 1285, only to be put suddenly to flight.

He died at Kutaisi in 1293. David was succeeded by his elder son, Constantine I. David is buried within the chapel (eukterion) of St. Andrew at the Cathedral of Nativity of the Theotokos of Gelati, east of the southern entrance to the church.

Marriage and children
He was married to Tamar, daughter of the Georgian noble Amanelisdze family. In 1254, he married Theodora, daughter of the Byzantine emperor Michael VIII Palaeologus.

 Konstantine I (by Tamar)
 Mikael I (by Tamar)
 Vakhtang II of Georgia (by Tamar)
 Aleksandre (by Theodora)

References

External links

 History of Georgia – XIII-XV centuries

Kings of Georgia
13th-century people from Georgia (country)
Eastern Orthodox monarchs
1225 births
1293 deaths
Burials at Svetitskhoveli Cathedral
Bagrationi dynasty of the Kingdom of Georgia
Seljuk Empire